Dominique Sorain (born 31 July 1955 in Caudéran, France) is a French senior civil servant. He has been serving as High Commissioner of the Republic in French Polynesia since 10 July 2019.

Honours and decorations

National honours

Ministerial honours

Civilian medals

References

1955 births
Living people
Commanders of the Order of Agricultural Merit
French civil servants
High Commissioners of the Republic in French Polynesia
Officers of the Ordre national du Mérite